I Don't Dance is the third studio album by American country music artist Lee Brice. It was released on September 9, 2014 via Curb Records.

Content
The album's lead single is its title track, which became a number one single on Country Airplay in mid 2014. "Drinking Class" is the second single.

Brice produced the title track by himself; he co-produced with Jon Stone of American Young on tracks 2, 7–9, and 11–13, and Kyle Jacobs and Matt McClure on tracks 3–6, and 10. He also played every instrument on the track "Girls in Bikinis".

"Sirens" appears in the video game Madden NFL 16.

Critical reception

I Don't Dance received positive reviews from music critics. It has a score of 69 out of 100 on Metacritic indicating "generally favorable reviews", based on 4 critics reviews.
Jon Freeman of Country Weekly rated the album "B". He praised the songwriting of the title track, as well as "Drinkin' Class", "My Carolina", and "The Airport Song", and described Brice's voice as "spectacular, ranging from a gentle whisper to a right-from-the-gut, serrated-edge howl that elevates even the most forgettable material into high drama." Freeman also praised the sparseness of the album's production.

Commercial performance
The album debuted on the Billboard 200 at No. 5, and No. 1 on the Top Country Albums chart with 39,000 copies sold in the United States in its debut week. The album has sold 247,400 copies in the US as of March 2016. On October 18, 2017, the song received gold status by the RIAA.

Track listing

Personnel
Adapted from liner notes.

 Carolyn Wann Bailey - strings (tracks 5, 10)
 Hari Bernstein - strings (tracks 5, 10)
 Travis Bettis - electric guitar (tracks 1, 2, 12)
 Jessica Blackwell - strings (tracks 5, 10)
Lee Brice - acoustic guitar (tracks 1, 7-9, 12), banjo (tracks 8, 9) electric guitar (tracks 3-5, 7, 11), handclaps (track 9), horn arrangements (track 10), keyboards (track 8), string arrangements (tracks 5, 10), lead vocals (all tracks), background vocals (tracks 1, 2, 4, 6-8, 11), "Heys" (track 9), whistle (track 8)
 Sara Brice - talking girl (track 8)
 Tom Bukovac - electric guitar (tracks 2, 13)
 Perry Coleman - background vocals (tracks 2, 4, 5-7, 11, 13)
 Chad Cromwell - drums (tracks 7, 11)
 Eric Darken - percussion (track 1)
 Charles Kenneth Dixon - strings (tracks 5, 10), copyist (tracks 5, 10)
 Chip Esten - handclaps (track 9), "Heys" (track 9)
 Dan Frizsell - programming (track 12)
 Ben Glover - background vocals (track 3)
 Kevin "Swine" Grantt - bass guitar (track 7)
 Adrienne Harmon - strings (tracks 5, 10)
 Mark Hill - bass guitar (tracks 3, 5, 6, 10)
 June Iwasaki - strings (tracks 5, 10)
 Mike Johnson - steel guitar (tracks 3-6)
 Charlie Judge - B-3 organ (track 11), horn arrangements (track 10), keyboards (tracks 1, 3-8), piano (track 6), programming (tracks 1-8, 11), string arrangements (tracks 5, 10), strings (track 11)
 Jeff King - electric guitar (tracks 3-6, 9, 10)
 Jennifer Kummer - french horn (track 10)
 Phillip Lammonds - acoustic guitar (track 12)
 Tim Lauer - keyboards (track 2)
 Tony Lucido - bass guitar (track 8, 9)
 Donnie Marple - drums (tracks 1, 4, 12)
 Matt McClure - programming (tracks 3-6)
 Pat McGrath - acoustic guitar (tracks 3-6, 10)
 Jerry McPherson - e-bow (track 1), electric guitar (tracks 1, 3-6, 9, 10)
 Miles McPherson - drums (track 6)
 Greg Morrow - drums (track 2)
 Emily Nelson - strings (tracks 5, 10)
 Justin Niebank - programming (track 1)
 Kelly Norman - background noise (track 13)
 Kelly Norris - background vocals (track 2)
 Russ Pahl - steel guitar (tracks 1, 9)
 Sarighandi D. Reist - strings (tracks 5, 10)
 Paul Rippee - bass guitar (tracks 1, 2)
 Maggie Rose - background vocals (track 13)
 Bradley Smith - B-3 organ (track 12), piano (track 13), background vocals (track 12)
 Jimmie Lee Sloas - bass guitar (tracks 4, 11, 12)
 Jon Stone - acoustic guitar (tracks 8, 11), electric guitar (track 7), handclaps (track 9), background vocals (tracks 2, 9), "Heys" (track 9), "Woos" and "Yeas" (track 8)
 Russell Terrell - background vocals (track 10)
 Patrick Walle - french horn (track 10)
 Jason Webb - B-3 organ (tracks 3, 6), keyboards (tracks 3, 6), piano (track 4), programming (track 6)
 Derek Wells - electric guitar (tracks 3-5, 10)
 Nir Z. - drums (tracks 3, 5, 8, 9, 10)

Chart performance

Weekly charts

Year-end charts

Singles

Certifications

References

2014 albums
Lee Brice albums
Curb Records albums